Cotyperiboeum antennarium is a species of beetle in the family Cerambycidae, the only species in the genus Cotyperiboeum.

References

Elaphidiini